Lyclene kontumica is a moth of the subfamily Arctiinae. It was described by Vladimir Viktorovitch Dubatolov and Karol Bucsek in 2013. It is found in Vietnam.

References

Nudariina
Moths described in 2013
Moths of Asia